The Barun Goyot Formation (also known as Baruungoyot Formation or West Goyot Formation) is a geological formation dating to the Late Cretaceous Period. It is located within and is widely represented in the Gobi Desert Basin, in the Ömnögovi Province of Mongolia.

Description 
It was previously known as the Lower Nemegt Beds occurring beneath the Nemegt Formation and above the Djadokhta Formation. It has been suggested that the Djadokhta and Barun Goyot Formations are lower and upper parts, respectively, of the same lithological unit and the boundary between the two does not exist. The stratotype of the Barun Goyot Formation is the Khulsan locality, east of Nemegt. At Nemegt, only the uppermost barungoyotian beds are visible. The Red Beds of Khermeen Tsav are also considered part of the Barun Goyot Formation. Given the new date for the start of the Maastrichtian (72.1 MYA) a basal Maastrichtian age seems probable. The Barun Goyot Formation preserves an environment of sand dunes, created from wind-eroded rocks (aeolian dunes).

Paleobiota of the Barun Goyot Formation

Lizards

Mammals

Dinosaurs

Alvarezsaurs

Ankylosaurs

Birds
{|class="wikitable sortable"
|-
! Genus !! Species !! Location !! Material !! Notes !! Images
|-
| rowspan="2"; style="background:#e3f5ff;" | Gobioolithus
| style="background:#e3f5ff;" | G. major
| style="background:#e3f5ff;" | Gilbent, Khulsan
| style="background:#e3f5ff;" | "Five eggs."
| style="background:#e3f5ff;" | Eggs probably laid by a bird.
| style="background:#e3f5ff;" |
|-
| style="background:#e3f5ff;" | G. minor
| style="background:#e3f5ff;" | Hermiin Tsav, Khulsan
| style="background:#e3f5ff;" | "Eggs with embryonic remains."
| style="background:#e3f5ff;" | Eggs probably laid by Gobipipus.
| style="background:#e3f5ff;" |
|-
| Gobipipus
| G. reshetovi
| Hermiin Tsav, Khulsan
| "Embryonic skulls and skeletons."
| An enantiornithine.
|
|-
| Gobipteryx
| G. minuta
| Hermiin Tsav, Khulsan
| "Skulls and partial skeletons, and embryonic remains."
| An enantiornithine. Also present in the Djadokhta Formation.
|
|-
| Hollanda
| H. luceria
| Hermiin Tsav
| "Partial hindlimbs from several specimens."
| An ornithuromorph.
| 
|-
| rowspan="3"; style="background:#e3f5ff;" | Protoceratopsidovum'''
| style="background:#e3f5ff;" | P. fluxuosum| style="background:#e3f5ff;" | Hermiin Tsav, Khulsan
| style="background:#e3f5ff;" | "Clutch of 19 eggs and isolated eggs."
| style="background:#e3f5ff;" | Eggs probably laid by a bird.
| style="background:#e3f5ff;" |
|-
| style="background:#e3f5ff;" | P. minimum| style="background:#e3f5ff;" | Ikh Shunkht
| style="background:#e3f5ff;" | "Clutch of eggs."
| style="background:#e3f5ff;" | Eggs probably laid by a bird.
| style="background:#e3f5ff;" |
|-
| style="background:#e3f5ff;" | P. sincerum| style="background:#e3f5ff;" | Hermiin Tsav
| style="background:#e3f5ff;" | "Partial egg."
| style="background:#e3f5ff;" | Eggs probably laid by a bird.
| style="background:#e3f5ff;" |
|-
| style="background:#e3f5ff;" | Styloolithus| style="background:#e3f5ff;" | S. sabathi| style="background:#e3f5ff;" | Khulsan
| style="background:#e3f5ff;" | "Partial eggs."
| style="background:#e3f5ff;" | Eggs probably laid by a bird.
| style="background:#e3f5ff;" |
|-
|}

Ceratopsians

Dromaeosaurs

Halszkaraptorines

Pachycephalosaurs

Oviraptorosaurs

Sauropods

Gallery

 See also 
 List of dinosaur-bearing rock formations
 List of fossil sites (with link directory)''

References 

 
Geologic formations of Mongolia
Upper Cretaceous Series of Asia
Sandstone formations
Geologic formations with imbedded sand dunes
Aeolian deposits